Winston Short (born 27 March 1945, in Arima) is a retired athlete from Trinidad and Tobago who specialized in the 200 metres and 4×100 metres relay.

He represented his country at the 1968 Summer Olympics, as well as in the relay races at the 1967 Pan American Games and 1966 British Empire and Commonwealth Games. He was a relay medallist at the 1966 Central American and Caribbean Games. He was a double bronze medallist in the sprints at the British West Indies Championships in 1965.

He graduated from Grambling College, Louisiana, United States.

International competitions

References

Best of Trinidad

1945 births
Living people
Trinidad and Tobago male sprinters
Olympic athletes of Trinidad and Tobago
Athletes (track and field) at the 1968 Summer Olympics
Commonwealth Games competitors for Trinidad and Tobago
Athletes (track and field) at the 1966 British Empire and Commonwealth Games
Pan American Games competitors for Trinidad and Tobago
Athletes (track and field) at the 1967 Pan American Games
Grambling State University alumni
People from Arima
Central American and Caribbean Games silver medalists for Trinidad and Tobago
Competitors at the 1966 Central American and Caribbean Games
Central American and Caribbean Games medalists in athletics